Niccolò III may refer to:

 Niccolò III dalle Carceri (died in 1383)
 Nicholas III Zorzi, Margrave of Bodonitsa from 1416 to 1436
 Niccolò III d'Este, Marquis of Ferrara (1383–1441)

See also

 Nicholas III (disambiguation)
 Niccolò (name)